The 2004 Senior British Open Championship, for sponsor reasons named Senior British Open Championship presented by MasterCard, was a senior major golf championship and the 18th Senior British Open Championship, held from 22 to 25 July at Royal Portrush Golf Club in Portrush, County Antrim, Northern Ireland, United Kingdom. It was the second Senior British Open Championship played as a senior major championship.

Pete Oakley won by one stroke over Tom Kite and Eduardo Romero to win his first Senior British Open title and first senior major championship victory.

Graham Marsh, who finished tied ninth, became the first player on the four main golf tours (PGA Tour, PGA European Tour, PGA Tour Champions or the Legends Tour) to ace the same hole twice in a tournament, when he had a hole-in-one on the 170-yard 11th hole in the third round with an 8-iron, as well as he did with a 9-iron in the first round.

Venue

Course layout

Source:

Field
The field consisted of 144 competitors; 138 professionals and six amateurs.

70 players made the 36-hole cut, 69 professionals and one amateur. Roy Smethurst finished leading amateur at tied 41st.

An 18-hole stroke play qualifying round was held on Monday, 19 July, on Valley Links, for players who were not already exempt. The 27 leading players from the qualifying competition joined the 117 exempt players for the championship.

Past champions in the field
Eight past Senior Open champions participated. Three of them made the 36-hole cut; 2003 champion Tom Watson (tied 22nd), 2002 champion Noboru Sugai (tied 46th) and 1989 and 1993 champion Bob Charles (tied 65th). 1987 champion Neil Coles, 1999 and 2000 champion Christy O'Connor Jnr, 1991 champion Bobby Verway, 2001 champion Ian Stanley and 1988, 1990 and  1997 champion Gary Player did not make the cut.

Past winners and runners-up at The Open Championship in the field 
The field included three former winners of The Open Championship. Two of them made the cut; 1975, 1977, 1980, 1982 and 1983 Open champion Tom Watson (tied 22nd), and 1963 Open champion Bob Charles (tied 65th). 1959, 1968 and 1974 Open champion Gary Player did not make the cut.

The field also included seven former runners-up at The Open Championship; Tom Kite (2nd), Mark McNulty (tied 5th), Andy Bean (tied 13th), Simon Owen (tied 38th), Ben Crenshaw (missed cut), Neil Coles (missed cut) and Rodger Davis (missed cut).

Final round summery and results 
Sunday, 25 July 2004

Pete Oakley sank a 10-foot par putt on the final hole to win by one stroke and avoid a playoff. The victory made him only the 10th open qualifier to win a Champions Tour event. Defending champion Tom Watson, who withdraw from The Open Championship the week before, due to a shoulder injury, finished tied 22nd, 13 shots from the winner.

Source:

References

External links 
 Results on European Tour website
 Results on PGA Tour website

Senior major golf championships
Golf tournaments in Northern Ireland
Senior British Open Championship
Senior British Open Championship
Senior British Open Championship